Rosemary Beach is an unincorporated planned community in Walton County, Florida, United States on a beach side road, CR 30A, on the Gulf Coast. Rosemary Beach is developed on land originally part of the older Inlet Beach neighborhood. The town was founded in 1995 by Patrick D. Bienvenue, President of Leucadia Financial Corporation, and was designed by Duany Plater-Zyberk & Company. The population of Rosemary Beach is approximately 4,328. Rosemary Beach is named after Rosemary Milligan, a realtor and gas station owner, whose gas station was located where the Donut Hole is located today.

Location

Rosemary Beach is located on the Gulf of Mexico in southeastern Walton County. U.S. Route 98 and County Road 30A are the main roads that run through the community. County Road 30A parallels the coast westward, leading northwest  to Seaside. There are many more beach towns that are close to Rosemary Beach, including Alys Beach, Seacrest, Water Sound, Water Color, Seagrove, Grayton, Inlet, etc.

Design 

Rosemary Beach is one of three planned communities on Florida's Gulf coast designed by Andrés Duany and Elizabeth Plater-Zyberk. The other two are Seaside and Alys Beach. The three are examples of a style of urban planning known as New Urbanism.

Rosemary Beach, designed in 1995, offers shops, restaurants, a hotel, and public green spaces. The design of the town reflects New Orleans’ French Quarter and European Colonial influences in the West Indies and Caribbean. Sustainable materials, natural color palettes, high ceilings for better air circulation, balconies, and easy access to the beach by foot are typical design features.

The architecture of the homes in Rosemary resemble places like New Orleans, St. Augustine, Charleston S.C., and the West Indies. The houses along Rosemary Beach are close together and are all neutral colored.

Beach 
Rosemary Beach beaches are only accessible to people who are staying in Rosemary at the time. To gain beach access, residents are required to have a code or a wristband to allow them to go to the beach.

The water at this beach is warm, so many people can be found in the waves in the ocean along with walking or jogging down the beach, building sand castles, and reading. Vacationers can also rent different water activities, like kayaking or paddle boarding. Many residents rent out their houses for the summer.

Tourism 
There are nature reserves located around the Rosemary area, like Eden Gardens State Park, Timpoochee Trail and Deer State Park, and Topsail Hill Preserve State Park. There are hiking trails and different wildlife located in these areas. Camping is also available at Topsail Hill Preserve State Park.

Tourism in Rosemary Beach has significantly spiked in the past few years. As tourists, the main form of transportation around the beach area is through biking. The temperature in Rosemary Beach during the summer ranges from a high of 90 degrees to a low of 75 degrees. During the winter months, the temperature ranges from a high of 66 degrees to a low of 45 degrees.

Water activities are popular here, like kayaking, paddle boarding, jet skiing, parasailing, and many more excursions. Along with the water activities, there are Blue Dolphin Tours, where one can sightsee for dolphins on a two-hour boat ride excursion. There is also a sunset tour option. There are many places for shopping around the 30A area. Almost every store is walkable from any place one stays. There are many boutiques which offer swimwear, beachwear, toys, home décor, souvenirs, etc.

Peddler's Pavilion is also a popular tourism spot for people in Rosemary Beach. There are many different places to eat, shop, and listen to live music.

See also
 Seaside, Florida
 Alys Beach, Florida
 New Urbanism

References

External links
Rosemary Beach

Unincorporated communities in Walton County, Florida
New Urbanism communities
New Classical architecture
Populated places established in 1995
Unincorporated communities in Florida
Populated coastal places in Florida on the Gulf of Mexico
Planned communities in Florida